The J.C. Miller House is a historic house at Oak and High Streets in Leslie, Arkansas.  It is a tall -story wood-frame structure in the American Foursquare style, with a hip roof pierced by hip-roofed dormers, and a single-story porch that wraps around two sides.  The construction date of the house is not known, but its first known occupant, J.C. Miller, was living in it in the 1920s.  It is one of Searcy County's best examples of early-20th century American Foursquare design.

The house was listed on the National Register of Historic Places in 1993.

See also
National Register of Historic Places listings in Searcy County, Arkansas

References

Houses on the National Register of Historic Places in Arkansas
Houses completed in 1905
Houses in Searcy County, Arkansas
National Register of Historic Places in Searcy County, Arkansas
1905 establishments in Arkansas